"I Wanna Be Loved" is a song written by Baker Knight and performed by Ricky Nelson. The song reached #20 on the Billboard Hot 100 and #30 in the UK in 1959.  The single's B-side, "Mighty Good", reached #38 on the Billboard Hot 100.

References

1959 songs
1959 singles
Songs written by Baker Knight
Ricky Nelson songs
Imperial Records singles